Grigori Panteleimonov (17 December 1885 – 31 October 1934) was a Russian sport shooter who competed in the 1912 Summer Olympics. He was born in Balta, now in Ukraine. He was part of the Russian 30 metre military pistol team, which won the silver medal. He also competed in the 30 metre rapid fire pistol event finishing 14th and in the 50 metre pistol finishing 17th.

References

External links
Grigori Panteleimonov's profile at databaseOlympics
Biography of Grigori Panteleimonov 

1885 births
1934 deaths
People from Balta, Ukraine
Male sport shooters from the Russian Empire
Ukrainian male sport shooters
ISSF pistol shooters
Shooters at the 1912 Summer Olympics
Olympic competitors for the Russian Empire
Olympic medalists in shooting
Medalists at the 1912 Summer Olympics
Sportspeople from Odesa Oblast